Elizabeth Louise Harrower (May 28, 1918 – December 10, 2003) was an American actress and television writer.

Early years 
Harrower was born during World War I in Alameda, California, during the great flu epidemic.

Career

Harrower went on to find success in television, including ten appearances on Dennis the Menace (mostly as Dennis' teacher, Miss Perkins), four appearances on Perry Mason (The Case of the Waylaid Wolf, The Case of the Lurid Letter), and two appearances on Gunsmoke as Mrs. O'Roarke, among many other shows up until 1974.

She made her film debut in Becky Sharp (1935). She also appeared in other movies, including 1969's True Grit and The Sterile Cuckoo.

In the late 1970s, she served as head writer for the daytime soap opera Days of Our Lives, where her daughter Susan was a cast member. She also wrote for The Young and the Restless in the 1980s and early 1990s. Her last writing stint was on the short-lived soap Generations in 1991. In 2003, Harrower received rave reviews for her performance as a drunken con artist on The Young and the Restless.

Personal life

In 1942, Harrower married Harry Seabold, an Air Force cadet she had met in fifth grade. Their daughter, actress Susan Seaforth Hayes, was born in 1943. The marriage ended in divorce. For many years, she and her daughter lived in the Alvarado Terrace Historic District of Los Angeles, where she was active with the Pico-Union community redevelopment project advisory committee. 

In 2003 in Studio City, California, Harrower died of cancer at age 85. She was interred in the Forest Lawn Memorial Park Cemetery in Glendale, California.

Selected filmography

References

External links
 

American soap opera writers
1918 births
2003 deaths
American film actresses
Actresses from the San Francisco Bay Area
Deaths from cancer in California
Burials at Forest Lawn Memorial Park (Glendale)
20th-century American actresses
American television actresses
People from Alameda, California
Women soap opera writers
American adoptees
20th-century American screenwriters
21st-century American women